State Trunk Highway 158 (often called Highway 158, STH-158 or WIS 158) is a state highway in the U.S. state of Wisconsin. It runs east–west as a suburban-to-urban route, connecting I-94 with downtown Kenosha. 

Highway 158 is known as 52nd Street for its entire length. The city of Kenosha uses a numbering system for its streets and avenues, numbering streets in ascending order from the Racine County line to the Illinois state line.

History
52nd Street in Kenosha was designated as Highway 158 in 1958, at about the same time that American Motors began selling cars after the merger of Nash Motors and Hudson Motors. AMC had their main engine plant on 52nd Street, and also had a vehicle "storage" lot on 88th Avenue (County Highway H, then WIS 192) along the Milwaukee Road railway. 52nd Street was extended to the West to I-94 the following year.

Highway 158 connects downtown Kenosha with the Kenosha Regional Airport, and served the now-defunct Dairyland Greyhound Park.

Major intersections

See also

References

External links

158
Transportation in Kenosha County, Wisconsin